Yokkaichi Dome is a multi-purpose indoor sporting arena located in Yokkaichi, Mie Prefecture, Japan.  The capacity of the arena is 4,704 people. It was built in 1997 as one of the events commemorating the 100th  anniversary of the establishment of Yokkaichi as a city.

Indoor arenas in Japan
Sports venues in Mie Prefecture
Covered stadiums in Japan
Yokkaichi
1997 establishments in Japan
Sports venues completed in 1997